Whisper Not is a 1966 studio album by American jazz singer Ella Fitzgerald, with the Marty Paich Orchestra. She had previously recorded with Marty Paich and his more familiar Dek-tette on the 1957 album Ella Swings Lightly.

Whisper Not is Ella's penultimate recording for the Verve label. Her 11 years on the Verve label had seen her make her most acclaimed recordings, critically and commercially. The jazz critic Will Friedwald described her pre-Verve work on Decca as "seeming a mere prelude", and her "post-Verve years as an afterthought".

Track listing 
For the 1967 Verve LP release; Verve V6-4071; Re-issued in 2002 on CD, Verve 314 589 478-2

Personnel 
Recorded July 20, 1966 at United Western Recorders, Hollywood, Los Angeles:

 Val Valentin – Engineer

Tracks 3–6
 Ella Fitzgerald – Vocals
 Harry Edison – Trumpet
 Jimmy Rowles – Piano
 Chuck Berghofer – Bass
 Louie Bellson – Drums
 Marty Paich – Arranger, Conductor.

Tracks 1–2, 7–12
 Ella Fitzgerald – Vocals
 Stu Williamson – Trumpet
 Bill Perkins – Tenor Saxophone
 Jimmy Rowles – Piano
 Al Viola – Guitar
 Joe Mondragon – Bass
 Shelly Manne – Drums
 Marty Paich – Arranger, Conductor.

References 

1967 albums
Albums arranged by Marty Paich
Albums conducted by Marty Paich
Albums produced by Norman Granz
Ella Fitzgerald albums
Verve Records albums